Paata Jincharadze (born 21 December 1974) is a retired Georgian footballer. He also holds Russian citizenship.

References

External links
 Profile at Football Facts

1974 births
Living people
Footballers from Georgia (country)
Cypriot First Division players
APEP FC players
FC Sokol Saratov players
Expatriate footballers in Cyprus
Expatriate footballers in Russia
Expatriate footballers from Georgia (country)
Association football midfielders
FC Neftekhimik Nizhnekamsk players
FC Dynamo Bryansk players
FC Chita players